Marquardt School District 15 is an elementary school district headquartered in Glendale Heights, Illinois. It serves sections of Glendale Heights, Addison, Bloomingdale, Glen Ellyn, and Lombard.  it had 2,700 students.

Schools
Its sole middle school is Marquardt Middle School in Glendale Heights.

Elementary schools:
 Black Hawk Elementary School (Glendale Heights)
 G. Stanley Hall Elementary School (Glendale Heights)
 Charles G. Reskin Elementary School (Glendale Heights)
 Winnebago Elementary School (Bloomingdale)

References

External links
 
 District boundary map
School districts in DuPage County, Illinois
Glendale Heights, Illinois
Addison, Illinois
Bloomingdale, Illinois
Glen Ellyn, Illinois
Lombard, Illinois